Klotz is a family of violin makers. Members of the Klotz (or Kloz) family have made violins in Mittenwald, Germany from the mid-17th century to the present. The Klotz family taught other families of the village the violin trade, and Mittenwald prospered and became well known for its violins. In A Dictionary of Music and Musicians 1900, the contributor Edward John Payne writes: "Nine-tenths of the violins which pass in the world as 'Stainers' were made by the Klotz family and their followers." 

In 1856, the Bavarian government founded a school in Mittenwald to continue the violin trade. Dictionaries of violin makers list more than 25 artisans by this name.

Matthias I (1656–1743) founded the Mittenwald school of violin making after study with Giovanni Railich in Padua from 1672 to 1678, Jacob Stainer and Nicolo Amati of Cremona. In Cremona, Matthias excelled as Amati's assistant and was harassed by other jealous assistants. Later he returned to Mittenwald and coined his hometown with the name "Cremona of Tyrol". He has been criticized for exercising insufficient skill or care in the selection of his wood. Although he was the maker of several very excellent specimens...His two sons, Sebastian (born in 1675) and Georg (born c.1677), were also makers of violins and greatly surpassed their father in every way... 
Typical labels:
 Mattias Klotz Geigenmacher zu Mittenwald an der Iser 1697
 Mathias Klotz Lauten und Geigenmacher in Mittenwald an der Iser Anno 1695
 Mathias Kloz Lautenmacher. A label of the family  in Mittenwalt Anno 1725.

Instruments by Sebastian I (1696–1768) are probably the most admired among the many existing examples by this family.  Some instruments which have been identified as Sebastian's work bear his father's label.
Typical labels:
 Sebastian Klotz in Mittenwald an der Iser 1734
 Sebastian Kloz, in Mittenwald, an 1743
 Seb. G. Kloz in Mittenwald, 1732

Josef (1743–1819), son of Sebastian, worked in a manner similar to that of his father.

The quality of their instruments varies enormously, and many inferior, unauthentic examples have labels bearing the Klotz name.

Translations 
 Geigenmacher: violin maker
 Lautenmacher: lute maker
 See also Luthier

References

External links 
 

German luthiers
People from Garmisch-Partenkirchen (district)
German families